Ravenhill Stadium (known as the Kingspan Stadium for sponsorship reasons) is a rugby stadium located in Belfast, Northern Ireland. It is the home of Ulster Rugby. With the opening of a new stand for the 2014 Heineken Cup quarter-final against Saracens on 5 April 2014, the capacity of the stadium is now 18,196. The stadium is owned by the Irish Rugby Football Union.

History
Ravenhill Stadium opened in 1923. It features an ornate arch at the entrance that was erected as a war memorial for those players killed in World War I and World War II. Prior to 1923, both Ulster and Ireland played games at the Royal Ulster Agricultural Society grounds in Belfast.

Ravenhill has been the annual venue for the Ulster Schools Cup final since 1924, which is traditionally contested on St Patrick's Day. The stadium is traditionally the venue for the Ulster Towns Cup, played on Easter Monday.

Ravenhill has hosted 18 international matches, including pool games in both the 1991 and 1999 Rugby World Cups. The most recent Ireland international played at the stadium was on 24 August 2007 against Italy in a warm-up match for the 2007 Rugby World Cup. Prior to that match, Scotland was the last visitor in the 1954 Five Nations Championship. Ravenhill also hosted the 2007 Under 19 Rugby World Championship final in which New Zealand defeated South Africa.

Ravenhill hosted memorable Ulster games in the Heineken Cup. Ulster beat Toulouse 15–13 at Ravenhill in the quarter-finals of the 1998–99 Heineken Cup. Ravenhill then hosted the 1998–99 Heineken Cup semi-final in which Ulster defeated Stade Français 33–27. The most memorable moment in that game was when out half David Humphreys ran from the Ulster 10-metre line to score a try.

On 5 June 2014, Ulster signed a 10-year contract with the Kingspan Group for the naming rights to Ravenhill, meaning that the stadium will be known as the Kingspan Stadium until 2024.

On 30 May 2015, the 2015 Pro12 Grand Final was played at the Kingspan Stadium. Glasgow Warriors beat Munster 31–13.

On 26 August 2017, the 2017 Women's Rugby World Cup Final was played at the Kingspan Stadium. New Zealand beat England 41–32. The semi-final matches and some play-off matches of the Women's Rugby World Cup were also played at the stadium.

2009 Redevelopment

The new stand at Ravenhill was officially opened on 9 October 2009 by First Minister Peter Robinson, before a match between Ulster and Bath Rugby. The stand has however been in use since the first home match of the 2009-2010 season, against Edinburgh Rugby.

The stand is on the Mount Merrion side of the ground, and consists of a terraced area, over 500 premium seats, and 20 corporate boxes. The terraced area is now covered by a roof for the first time in the stadium's history. The cost of the project is approximately £4.5 million, and has been funded by a mixture of public-sector funding, sales of premium tickets and boxes, and loans from the IRFU.

2012–2014 Redevelopment
In 2011, the Northern Ireland Executive announced that it had granted £138m for various stadium redevelopment projects throughout Northern Ireland. Ulster Rugby received £14.5m, which was used to redevelop Ravenhill and expand its capacity from 12,000 to 18,000.

In 2012, Ulster Rugby confirmed that three new stands would be built at Ravenhill, with work commencing in late 2012. Two new stands at the Memorial and Aquinas ends of the stadium were completed while the main stand was demolished and rebuilt. The major refurbishment was completed in April 2014.

Ireland Internationals

Updated 21 April 2021

Rugby World Cup Matches

Ulster Home Attendance

Up to date as of the 2021–22 season.

Ravenhill Facilities Prior to Redevelopment

References

External links

Ulster Rugby
Rugby union stadiums in Ireland
Sports venues in Belfast
Sports venues completed in 1923
1923 establishments in Northern Ireland